David J. Flavell FRCPath is a British academic research scientist who specializes in the development of antibody-based treatments for adults and children with various forms of leukaemia and lymphoma.

Early life 

Born in Southport, Lancashire, in 1953, he obtained his bachelor's degree in applied Biology from Liverpool in 1975, and his Ph.D. in cancer immunology from Sheffield in 1978. He has held posts at the University of Sheffield (1975–78), Mahidol University, Bangkok, Thailand (1978–79), The University of London, London School of Hygiene and Tropical Medicine (1979–1983) and the University of Southampton Medical School (1984–2005).  He became a member of The Royal Society of Pathologists in 1997, and later a Fellow of the same Royal Society in 2004. In 2014, he was conferred the title of Honorary Fellow of Liverpool John Moores University for his contribution to cancer research over his long career.

Career 

David Flavell co-founded the children’s leukaemia research charity Leukaemia Busters  with his wife Dr. Sopsamorn (Bee) Flavell, Robert and Wendy Sutcliffe, and Julie Daws. In 1989, shortly after the formation of Leukaemia Busters, he became the charity’s honorary Scientific Director, and remained so until 2005 when he retired from his post as Senior Lecturer at the University of Southampton to become a full-time Scientific Director for the charity and to perform research with the Recombinant Immunotoxin Collaborative Group. He has retained an honorary title with the University of Southampton Medical School.

During David Flavell’s career in cancer research, which spans more than 35 years, he has made significant research contributions in a number of areas, most notably the development of a particular class of antibody-based drug termed immunotoxins that are capable of targeting cancer cells in the patients' body without harming normal tissues. He has been largely responsible for three separate early phase clinical trials with immunotoxins in adult patients with B-cell non-Hodgkin’s lymphoma (B-NHL), multiple myeloma and in children with pre-B cell acute lymphoblastic leukaemia (ALL).

David Flavell also heads The Simon Flavell Leukaemia Research Laboratory at Southampton General Hospital, named after his ten-year-old son who died with T-cell acute lymphoblastic leukaemia in 1990. The main thrust of his current research is concerned with the development of the next generation of genetically engineered immunotoxins and devising ways of improving their therapeutic effectiveness and widening their therapeutic window.

Over the years, David Flavell has published many original research papers in high-ranking international medical journals, and as chapters in various academic book titles. He continues to collaborate with scientists in Italy, Germany, Thailand and the US in pursuit of his research objective of devising improved treatments for patients with currently incurable forms of leukemia and lymphoma.

Family 

David Flavell has been married to Dr. Sopsamorn (Bee) Flavell since 1978, with whom he has worked in medical research almost continuously since 1975. They have two daughters and live in Hampshire.

References

Living people
Cancer researchers
1953 births
British medical researchers
20th-century British scientists
21st-century British scientists
Scientists from Lancashire
People from Southport
Academics of the University of Sheffield
David Flavell
Academics of the London School of Hygiene & Tropical Medicine
Academics of the University of Southampton
Fellows of the Royal College of Pathologists